A background check is a process a person or company uses to verify that an individual is who they claim to be, and this provides an opportunity to check and confirm the validity of someone's criminal record, education, employment history, and other activities from their past. The frequency, purpose, and legitimacy of background checks vary among countries, industries, and individuals. An employment background check typically takes place when someone applies for a job, but it can also happen at any time the employer deems necessary. A variety of methods are used to complete these checks including comprehensive database search and personal references.

Purposes 

Thera are 18 common types of background checks employers use to verify a new hire. The checks can include: 
 Criminal history
 Past employment verification
 Education verification
 Reference check
 Drug screening
 Sexual offenses check
 Credit background check
 Social media behavior check
 Driving record
 Professional license and certifications check
 Social security number trace/identity check
 Global sanctions check
 Civil offenses check
 Bankruptcy check
 Financial regulations check
 Psychometric tests
 International background check
 Gamer profile check.

Each check is briefly explained along with its purpose and how it helps employers make informed hiring decisions.

Employment screening 
Background checks are often requested by employers on job candidates for employment screening, especially on candidates seeking a position that requires high security or a position of trust, such as in a school, courthouse, hospital, financial institution, airport, and government. They can also be requested when purchasing a firearm (from a legal authorization). These checks are traditionally administered by a government agency for a nominal fee, but they can also be administered by private companies. Results of a background check typically include past employment verification, credit history, and criminal history. The objective of background checks is to ensure the safety and security of the employees in the organization.

These checks are often used by employers as a means of judging a job candidate's past mistakes, character, and fitness, and to identify potential hiring risks for safety and security reasons. Background checks are also used to thoroughly investigate potential government employees in order to be given a security clearance. However, these checks can sometimes be used for illegal purposes, such as unlawful discrimination (or employment discrimination), identity theft, and violation of privacy.

Checks are frequently conducted to confirm information found on an employment application or résumé/curriculum vitae. One study showed that half of all reference checks done on prospective employees differed between what the job applicant provided and what the source reported. They are also conducted as a way to further differentiate potential employees and pick the one the employer feels is best suited for the position. Employers have an obligation to make sure their work environment is safe for all employees and helps prevent other  employment problems in the workplace.

Firearms purchases

In the United States, the Brady Bill requires criminal checks for those wishing to purchase handguns from licensed firearms dealers. Restricted firearms (like machine guns), suppressors, explosives or large quantities of precursor chemicals, and concealed weapons permits also require criminal checks. Checks are also required for those working in positions with special security concerns, such as trucking, ports of entry, and airports (including airline transportation). Laws exist to prevent those who do not pass a criminal check from working in careers involving the elderly, disabled, or children.

Pre-employment screening
Pre-employment screening refers to the process of investigating the backgrounds of potential employees and is commonly used to verify the accuracy of an applicant's claims as well as to discover any possible criminal history, workers compensation claims, or employer sanctions.

Brazil 
The Brazilian legal system prohibits discrimination against people. Many people consider background checks to be discriminatory.

Regulation and Laws on Background Checks
 Brazilian Constitution, Article 3, IV
 Brazilian Constitution, Article 5, X
 Brazilian Constitution, Article 7, XXXI
 Law No. 9.029/95

Netherlands 
It is the responsibility of the employer to treat all personal information collected from the employee as confidential information and to limit the access to this information within the organization. The employer cannot retain the personal information from the applicant and must have protective measures in case of data breach. The employer must give the applicant the ability to access the personal information being held about them. Dutch Data Protection Authority must be notified of the background check.

Restrictions and Laws on Background checks

 The Data Protection Act 2001
 The Equal Treatment Act 1994
 The Judicial Data and Criminal Records Act 2004
 The Medical Examinations Act 1998
 Article 8 of the European Convention on Human Rights

Poland 
The first Polish research on the issue of pre-employment screening shows that 81% of recruiters have come across the phenomenon of lies in the CVs of candidates for the job. It is the responsibility of the employer to collect necessary information and to protect it so that only certain people in the organization can access it. The applicant must receive a copy of the background check so that the applicant has the opportunity to make sure that the information in the background check is correct. The employer is not permitted to keep the personal information for a longer period than necessary.

Restrictions and Laws on Background checks
 The Polish Constitution dated 2 April 1997
 Article 8 of the European Convention on Human Rights
 Act of 26 June 1974 on The Labour Code
 Act of 24 May 2000 on National Criminal Records
 Act of 4 March 1994 on the Company Social Fund
 Act of 29 August 1997 on Personal Data Protection
 Regulation of Work and Social Policy Minister dated 28 May 1996

United Kingdom 
The employer has to treat the personal information from the applicant as confidential. The applicant has to receive a copy of the background to check or update the information that appears on the background check. The employer can not retain the information more than it is necessary. The employer has to give any one who comes in contact with the information of the applicant a code of conduct. The company has to go through an audit to make sure they are complying and protecting the data.

Restrictions and Laws on Background Checks

 Criminal records checks: Protection of Freedoms Act 2012, Rehabilitation of Offenders Act 1974, Rehabilitation of Offenders Act 1974 (Exceptions) Order 1975
 Ability to work in the UK: Immigration, Asylum and Nationality Act 2006
 The Equality Act 2010
 Data Protection Act 1998
 Article 8 of the European Convention on Human Rights (and Human Rights Act 1998)

Since the onset of the financial crisis of 2007–2010, the level of fraud has almost doubled and some experts have predicted that it will escalate further. Background-checking firm Powerchex has claimed the number of applicants lying on their applications has been increasing since the summer of 2007 when the financial crisis began. In 2009, Powerchex claimed that nearly one in 5 applicants has a major lie or discrepancy on his or her application. Almost half (48%) of organizations with fewer than 100 staff experienced problems with vetted employees. The research shows how many failures occurred in the relationship between employer and employee over the years and what dangers it brings. Applicants usually lie about additional skills (85%), dates of employment (58%), responsibilities (53%) or positions (28%).

Regulation 
 The Financial Services Authority states in their Training & Competence guidance that regulated firms should have:
 Adequacy of procedures for taking into account knowledge and skills of potential recruits for the role
 Adequacy of procedures for obtaining sufficient information about previous activities and training
 Adequacy of procedures for ensuring that individuals have passed appropriate exams or have appropriate exemptions
 Adequacy of procedures for assessing competence of individuals for sales roles

The Financial Services Authority's statutory objectives:

 Protecting consumers
 Maintaining market confidence
 Promoting public awareness
 Reducing financial crime

United States 
The employer must obtain consent from the applicant granting approval of the background check. The employer must be in accordance with the Fair Credit Reporting Act. The employers have to guarantee that they will not discriminate against the applicant.

Most notably, the Fair Credit Reporting Act (FCRA) regulates the use of consumer reports (which it defines as information collected and reported by third party agencies) as it pertains to adverse decisions, notification to the applicant, and destruction and safekeeping of records. If a consumer report is used as a factor in an adverse hiring decision, the applicant must be presented with a "pre-adverse action disclosure," a copy of the FCRA summary of rights, and a "notification of adverse action letter." Individuals are entitled to know the source of any information used against them, including a credit reporting company. Individuals must also consent in order for the employer to obtain a credit report.

Restriction and laws on Background Check
 Arrest and conviction records: Title VII of the Civil Rights Act of 1964; Cal. Lab. Code § 432.7; Cal. Lab. Code § 432.8; Cal. Pen. Code § 290.46(k)(2); 775 ILCS 5/2-103; Job Opportunities for Qualified Applicants Act, 820 ILCS 75/15; N.Y. Correct. Law § 752; N.Y. Exec. Law § 296 (15), (16); 18 Pa.C.S. § 9125
 Credit/financial checks: Consumer Credit Reporting Agencies Act, Cal. Civ. Code § 1785.13; Cal. Lab. Code § 1024.5; 820 ILCS 70/10 
 Health checks/medical screening: Americans with Disabilities Act, 42 U.S.C. § 12101, et seq.; Genetic Information Nondiscrimination Act, 42 U.S.C. § 2000ff, et seq.; Cal. Lab. Code § 132a
 Social media: Cal. Lab. Code § 980; 820 ILCS 55/10(a)
 Record disposal: 16 CFR Part 682 
 Record keeping: 29 CFR Part 160
 Records/information obtained from consumer reporting agencies, including but not limited to education and employment records, credit and financial records, and social media: Fair Credit Reporting Act, 15 U.S.C. § 1681, et seq.; Consumer Credit Reporting Agencies Act, Cal. Civ. Code § 1785.13(a)(6); Investigative Consumer Reporting Agencies Act, Cal. Civ. Code § 1786.18(a)(7); Cal. Civ. Code § 1786.53
 Political affiliation: D.C. Code § 2–1402.11; Wis. Stat. Ann. § 111.321
 Polygraph tests: Employee Polygraph Protection Act, 29 U.S.C. §§ 2002, 2006; Cal. Lab. Code § 432.2; 225 ILCS 430/14.1; N.Y. Lab. Law §§ 733–739; 18 Pa.C.S. § 7321

Florida
Title XLV, section 768.095 of the Florida Statutes is a law that allows former employers to disclose information about an employee to a future employer, protecting employers from negligent hiring liabilities. Employers use disclosed information from past employers when a background check does not provide enough information on the employee. Employers have to verify that the information disclosed to them is true because if it is false, the employer will be violating the civil rights of the employee.

Obtaining background checks 
There are a variety of types of investigative searches that can be used by potential employers. Many commercial sites will offer specific searches to employers for a fee. Services like these will actually perform the checks, supply the company with adverse action letters, and ensure compliance throughout the process. It is important to be selective about which pre-employment screening agency one uses. A legitimate company will maintain a background check policy and will explain the process. 

Many employers choose to search the most common records such as criminal records, driving records, and education verification. Other searches such as sex offender registry, credential verification, skills assessment, reference checks, credit reports and Patriot Act searches are becoming increasingly common. 

Larger companies are more likely to outsource than their smaller counterparts – the average staff size of the companies who outsource is 3,313 compared to 2,162 for those who carry out in-house checks. Financial service firms had the highest proportion of respondents who outsource the service, with over a quarter (26%) doing so, compared to an overall average of 16% who outsource vetting to a third party provider. The construction and property industry showed the lowest level of outsourcing, with 89% of such firms in the sample carrying out checks in-house, making the overall average 16%. This can increase over the years. Companies that choose to outsource must be sure to use companies that are Fair Credit Reporting Act (FCRA) compliant. Companies that fail to use an FCRA compliant company may face legal issues. 

As a general rule, employers may not take adverse action against an applicant or employee (not hiring or terminating them), solely on the basis of results obtained through a database search. Database searches, as opposed to source records searches (search of actual county courthouse records), are notoriously inaccurate, contain incomplete or outdated information, and should only be used as an added safety net when conducting a background check. Failure by employers to follow FCRA guidelines can result in hefty penalties.

Criminal records 
In the United States, the employer could use criminal records as verification as long as the employer does not discriminate based on race, color, religion, sex or national origin, as analyzed under the disparate treatment and disparate impact frameworks. There are several types of criminal record searches available to employers, some more accurate and up to date than others. These "third party" background checking agencies cannot guarantee the accuracy of their information, thus many of them have incomplete records or inaccurate records. The only way to conduct an accurate background check is to go directly through the state. Most times using the state of choice is much cheaper than using a "third party" agency. Many websites offer the "instant" background check, which will search a compilation of databases containing public information for a fee. These "instant" searches originate from a variety of sources, from statewide court and corrections records to law enforcement records which usually stem from county or metro law enforcement offices. There are also other database-type criminal searches, such as statewide repositories and the national crime file. A commonly used criminal search by employers who outsource is the county criminal search.

Social media 
Employers could use social media as tool to conduct a background check on an applicant. An employer could check the applicant's Facebook, Twitter, and LinkedIn accounts to see how the applicant behaves outside of work. U.S. employers are legally prohibited from taking into account anything they discover about a person's marital status, sexual orientation, religion, or political views when making the final decision to hire or not hire the applicant.
Some companies provide Media Mentions Reports collected from open sources including Social Media public accounts.

Character reference checks 
Employers may investigate past employment to verify position and salary information. More intensive checks can involve interviews with anybody that knew or previously knew the applicant—such as teachers, friends, coworkers, neighbors, and family members; however, extensive hearsay investigations in background checks can expose companies to lawsuits. Past employment and personal reference verifications are moving toward standardization with most companies in order to avoid expensive litigation. These usually range from simple verbal confirmations of past employment and timeframe to deeper, such as discussions about performance, activities and accomplishments, and relations with others. The past experiences and the companies which have provided these experiences are also verified and researched upon to detect frauds.

Identity and address verification 
A fraudulent SSN may be indicative of identity theft, incorrect claims of citizenship status, or concealment of a "past life". Background screening firms usually perform a Social Security trace to determine where the applicant or employee has lived. The hiring of undocumented workers has become an increasing issue for American businesses since the formation of the Department of Homeland Security and its Immigration and Customs Enforcement (ICE) division, as immigration raids have forced employers to consider including legal working status as part of their background screening process. All employers are required to keep government Form I-9 documents on all employees and some states mandate the use of the federal E-Verify program to research the working status of Social Security numbers. With increased concern for right-to-work issues, many outsourcing companies are sprouting in the marketplace to help automate and store Form I-9 documentation.

Credit check 
Credit checks are conducted for applicants who are applying to positions that deal with financial records or deal with a lot of money. For example, in the state of Illinois, employers could use an applicant's credit history, only the credit score is considered satisfactory. Individuals must also give consent in order for the employer to obtain a credit report. Pre-employment credit reports do not include a credit score. A pre-employment credit report will show up on an individual's credit report as a "soft inquiry" and do not affect the individual's credit score.

Controversies 
Drug tests and credit checks for employment are highly controversial practices.  According to the Privacy Rights Clearinghouse, a project of the Utility Consumers' Action Network (UCAN):  "While some people are not concerned about background investigations, others are uncomfortable with the idea of investigators poking around in their personal histories. In-depth checks could unearth information that is irrelevant, outdated, taken out of context, or just plain wrong. A further concern is that the report might include information that is illegal to use for hiring purposes or which comes from questionable sources."

In May 2002, allegedly improper post-hire checks conducted by Northwest Airlines were the subject of a civil lawsuit between Northwest and 10,000 of their mechanics.

In the case of an arrest that did not lead to a conviction, employment checks can continue including the arrest record for up to seven years, per § 605 of the Fair Credit Reporting Act:

 Except as authorized under subsection (b) of this section, no consumer reporting agency may make any consumer report containing  . . . Civil suits, civil judgments, and records of arrest that from date of entry, antedate the report by more than seven years or until the governing statute of limitations has expired, whichever is the longer period.

Subsection (b) provides for an exception if the report is in connection with "the employment of any individual at an annual salary which equals, or which may reasonably be expected to equal $75,000, or more".

Some proposals for decreasing potential harm to innocent applicants include:
 Furnishing the applicant with a copy of the report before it is given to the employer, so that any inaccuracies can be addressed beforehand; and
 Allowing only conviction (not arrest) records to be reported.

In New Zealand, criminal checks have been affected by the Criminal Records (Clean Slate) Act 2004, which allows individuals to legally conceal "less serious" convictions from their records provided they had been conviction-free for at least seven years.

In Michigan, the system of criminal checks has been criticized in a recent case where a shooting suspect was able to pass an FBI check to purchase a shotgun although he had failed the check for a state handgun permit.  According to the spokesman of the local police department,

 "... you could have a clear criminal history but still have contacts with law enforcement that would not rise to the level of an arrest or conviction [that can be used] to deny a permit whether or not those involved arrests that might show up on a criminal history."

The Brady Campaign to Prevent Gun Violence has criticized the federal policy, which denies constitutional rights based on a criminal check only if the subject has been accused of a crime.

See also

 Credit check
 Criminal record check
 Employment discrimination
 Identity resolution
 Negligence in employment
 Psychological evaluation
 Security clearance
 Solid (web decentralization project)
 Universal background check, a U.S. political term regarding firearm sales
 Vetting
 Online vetting
 Vaccination records

References 

Law enforcement
Criminal records
Public records
Recruitment
Security